Abadía is a Spanish municipality located at an altitude of 442 metres above sea-level in the Autonomous Community of Estremadura, province of Cáceres. In 2001 its population was 272 – c. 6 people per square kilometre within an area of 45 km².

It name is due to the abandoned Abbey next to the town.

References

Municipalities in the Province of Cáceres